, provisional designation , is a sub-kilometer asteroid on an eccentric orbit, classified as near-Earth object and potentially hazardous asteroid of the Apollo group. It was discovered on 18 June 2012 by astronomers of the Catalina Sky Survey at an apparent magnitude of 19.9 using a  Schmidt–Cassegrain telescope. The asteroid was listed on Sentry Risk Table with a Torino Scale rating of 1 on 23 June 2012.

Orbit and classification 

 is a member of the Apollo asteroids, a group of near-Earth objects with an Earth-crossing orbit. It orbits the Sun at a distance of 1.0–3.1 AU once every 2 years and 11 months (1,076 days; semi-major axis of 2.06 AU). Its orbit has an eccentricity of 0.51 and an inclination of 11° with respect to the ecliptic.

On 24 June 2012 with an observation arc of 6 days,  showed a 1 in 7,140 chance of impacting Earth on 1 June 2015. It was removed from the Sentry Risk Table on the next day (25 June).

With an observation arc of 113 days, the JPL Small-Body Database (solution JPL 42 dated 2013-Aug-05) shows that  may make a very close approach to asteroid 29 Amphitrite on 8 April 2179.

Numbering and naming 

This minor planet was numbered by the Minor Planet Center on 25 September 2018. As of 2018, it has not been named.

References

External links 
 List of the Potentially Hazardous Asteroids (PHAs), Minor Planet Center
 
 
 

523662
523662
523662
523662
Near-Earth objects in 2012
20120618